Miss Malaysia World 1993, the 27th edition of the Miss World Malaysia pageant was held on August 15, 1993, at the Grand Mahkota Ballroom, Istana Hotel in Kuala Lumpur. Miss Malaysia World 1992, Fazira Wan Chek crowned her successor, Jacqueline Ngu from Sarawak at the end of the event. She then represented Malaysia at Miss World 1993.

The winner received RM20,000 and will also be given a scholarship to continue her studies in a course of her own choice as well as acting in dramas produced by HVD Television Production Sdn. Bhd. A total of nine special awards were also held before the finals began, namely Miss Photogenic, Miss Physique, Miss elegant, Miss Christian dior, Miss Crowning Glory, Miss Kose, Miss Body Beautiful, Miss Eyewear Beauty and Best Traditional Costume.

The organizers held a competition to find the Miss Photogenic at the Sungai Wang Plaza shopping complex on August 14, 1993. The competition offered various attractive prizes for the winners, including ten rolls of Fuji brand films.

Results

Special awards

Contestants

Crossovers 
Contestants who previously competed/appeared at other international/national beauty pageants:
National competition

Miss Malaysia World
 1992 – Chew Sing Ying (Represented Penang; Unplaced)

State competition

Miss Penang  
 1992 – Chew Sing Ying (Winner)

References 

Miss World
1992
1993 in Malaysia
1993 beauty pageants